The BMW M41 was a straight-4 turbocharged indirect injection Diesel engine produced from 1994 through 2000.

M41D17

With the M41 engine the first four-cylinder diesel engine was introduced by BMW.

Then engine derived from the six-cylinder BMW M51 engine and shared 86% of the components, resulting in only 14% being newly developed.

This engine became available in several models of the E36 model series

 4-door sedan
 5-door touring
 3-door compact

Applications:
 1994 - 2000 E36 318tds

See also
 List of BMW engines

External links 
 The UnixNerd's BMW M41 engine page with photos, history and common problems.

M41
1994 introductions
Diesel engines by model

Straight-four engines